Bi Chunfang (14 July 1927 - 14 August 2016) was a Chinese Yue opera  performer, known as the founder of the "Bi style" of Yue opera. Born in Shanghai of Ningbo ancestry, she joined the Xuesheng troupe led by Yuan Xuefen in 1948, later joining the Dongshan troupe led by Fan Ruijuan and Fu Quanxiang. She partnered with Qi Yaxian.

Biography

Timeline
	Bi studied in Shanghai hung hing stage to learn the performance skills, and started to perform with Xu Tianhong, Wang Wenjuan and other performers after graduating in 1943.
	Joined Tian Hong troupe organized by Xu Tianhong in 1946. Joined Xuesheng troupe in 1948. Joined Dongshan Yue Opera troupe in 1949.
	Partner with Qi Yaxian since joined Hezuo troupe in 1951.
	Performed in Hong Kong five times from 1983 to 1989.
	The three-episode art film was made based on her true story and won several awards in 1986.
	Performed in U.S. in 1989 
	Bi is hired to be counselor of Jing An cultural troupe since the intangible cultural heritage protect program has been activated.

Bi style
In Yue opera, the female and male characters are all played by woman, (though there are several great male player now) and Bi genre becomes one of the main genre of the young man's role in Yue Opera.                           
"Her performances are elegant, relaxed and natural which is suit for comedy. The influences of Yin Guifang and Fan Ruijuan can be seen in her aria, but she sings clearly and loud in a wide range, thus it’s elastic for the audience."                                                                         
"Bi is good at performing comedy characters, as well as use an exaggerate tone, which makes the show funny and enjoyable."
Bi style is largely imitated by amateurs.

Performance 

She shaped successfully the character in many plays, the list below recorded only part of her great performance.
Her other works include: True Feelings Unbounded, The Teacher's Diary, She in the Rain, The Murder of the Murderers, and The Bloody Handprint, among others.

See also
Chinese opera
Yue opera
Zhejiang Yue Opera Troupe

References

External links 
 Yueju Opera on P.R. China Ministry of Culture
Welcome to Mildchina: Yueju Opera
China’s disappearing traditions: Carvings in lime, singing Yue
History of Yue Opera

1927 births
2016 deaths
Yue opera actresses
Singers from Shanghai
20th-century Chinese women singers
Male impersonators in Yue opera
Actresses from Shanghai
20th-century Chinese actresses